Hill-Murray School is a coeducational private Catholic school serving grades 6–12. It is located on a  site in Maplewood, Minnesota, United States, a suburb of Saint Paul. Located in the Roman Catholic Archdiocese of Saint Paul and Minneapolis, it was established in 1971 as a result of the consolidation of Archbishop Murray Memorial High School and Hill High School. Archbishop Murray was founded in 1958 by the Benedictine Sisters as a school for young women. Hill High was established in 1959 by the Christian Brothers as a school for young men. The Middle School was added in 1989. The student population is drawn from the Twin Cities, surrounding suburban areas, and nearby Wisconsin communities. Hill-Murray is one of only twenty-one Minnesota high schools accredited by the North Central Association of Colleges and Schools.

Athletics
Hill-Murray is a member of the Metro East Conference in the Minnesota State High School League. There are 24 Varsity sports teams for men and women. The athletic department is known for its boys hockey team, led by head coach Bill Lechner. The Pioneers have won four MSHSL state championships and have a record of 277–90–15. The school's hockey rivalry with White Bear Lake has deep roots and is considered to be the most intense and most watched rivalry in the state, routinely drawing sold-out crowds in the thousands to Aldrich Arena.

 Hill (1970) and Hill-Murray (1972) won Independent (non-MSHSL) State Hockey Titles
 Hill-Murray (1972) won Independent (non-MSHSL) State Baseball Title
 The Pioneers won state titles in several sports prior to joining the MSHSL in 1974/75

Performing Arts 
Hill-Murray is well known for its various performing arts programs. It has eight different bands, five choirs, and the theatre department produces six shows each year.

Academics

Community 
Hill-Murray has a very diverse student background, including different cultures, faiths, and economic backgrounds. The school draws students from 110 different middle and elementary schools. Out of the entire student body, 10% of  students are students of color, 80% of  students are Catholic, and 96% of students participate in at least one co-curricular activity. The student body comes from all over the metro area, including parts of Wisconsin.

The school catered to grades 7-12 until the 2015–2016 school year, when a 6th grade was added.

Notable alumni
 Steve Janaszak, professional ice hockey player, 1980 Olympic "Miracle On Ice" Team
 Craig Johnson, professional ice hockey player
 Dave Langevin, professional ice hockey player, member of 4 New York Islanders Stanley Cup Championship teams
 Tom Quinlan, baseball player for the Minnesota Twins & Toronto Blue Jays
 Robb Quinlan, professional baseball player for the Anaheim Angels from 2003 to 2010. Current Minnesota Golden Gophers 1st base coach.
 Lino Rulli, Emmy Award-winning producer and radio host (The Catholic Guy)
 Joe Soucheray, syndicated talk show host
 Jake Guentzel, professional ice hockey player for the Pittsburgh Penguins 
 Mike Hoeffel, professional ice hockey player
 David Tanabe, professional ice hockey player
 Hannah Brandt, olympic hockey player Team USA, 2018 Pyeongchang Winter Olympics, US National Team member 
 Marissa Brandt, olympic hockey player Team Korea, 2018 Pyeongchang Winter Olympics
 Jack Cichy, professional football player for the Tampa Bay Buccaneers, Super Bowl LV winner
 Joey Anderson, professional hockey player for the New Jersey Devils.
 Mikey Anderson, professional hockey player for the Los Angeles Kings.

References

Roman Catholic Archdiocese of Saint Paul and Minneapolis
Catholic secondary schools in Minnesota
Educational institutions established in 1971
Private middle schools in Minnesota
1971 establishments in Minnesota
Private high schools in Minnesota